Goddy Leye (24 November 1965 in Mbouda, Cameroon – 19 February 2011 in Bonendale, Cameroon) was a Cameroonian artist and intellectual.

His work is focused on videos, installations, conceptual art and theoretical contributions. He is the founder of the art centre ArtBakery in Bonendale, Cameroon and he was the curator and promoter of site-specific art and international projects. His role was central in the cultural and art scene in Cameroon and at the international level.

Life and career 
Goddy Leye (real name Godfried Kadjo) was born 24 November 1965 in Mbouda, Cameroon. He obtained his diploma at a bilingual high school in 1989 and studied African literature and philology at the University of Yaoundé between 1986 and 1991. In 1990 he obtain his master's in African literature. 
His artistic training started in 1987 with the artist and art historian Pascal Kenfack in Yaoundé until 1992. He continued his training in 1994 at the National Art Institute in Bamako, in 1997 at the ZKM Karlsruhe Centre for Art and Media in Germany, in 1999 at 18th Street Arts Complex in Santa Monica, California and between 2002 and 2002 at the Rijksakademie van Beeldende Kunsten in Amsterdam. In the Netherlands he co-funds and he becomes member of the Rijksakademie International Network (RAIN), a network of artists who support contemporary cultural practices in their countries of origin. Specifically for his interest in supporting art practices, Leye moved back to Douala in 2002 to create the art centre ArtBakery in Bonendale, devoted specifically to facilitating artistic training and exchanges among artists and to support multimedia, installations, video and digital art.

In 2002 he was the curator of the project Bessengue City, a workshop and a series of site-specific art projects in the neighbourhood of Bessengue in Douala; the project involved Goddy Leye, James Beckett, Hartanto, Jesus Palomino and the local community. In 2006 he promoted and participated in Exit Tour. In 2007 contributed to the Ars&Urbis Workshop organised in Douala by doual'art for the preparation of the SUD Salon Urbain de Douala and he was in residency at the Blachère Foundation in Apt, France. In 2008 he was in residency at the Gasworks cultural space in London; in 2009 he participated at the project Image Art After in dialogue with Florence Ayisi and he contributed at the Cairo Residency Symposium.

Leye's work received prizes from UNESCO, the Rockefeller Foundation and the Dutch Ministry of Foreign Affairs. As an artist and intellectual, he was involved in numerous expert committees; he was a member of the think tank of the Africa Centre in Cape Town and was an ambassador of CAN (Creative Africa Network).

Work 
Leye started working as an artist in 1992. His work was focussed on memory, African postcolonialism and on the construction of history. More specifically he expressed himself with multimedia works, videos and video installations. Through time, he started to be involved more and more in the production of projects both in Cameroon and at an international level. He contributed to publications, produced and curated site-specific artworks and founded the centre ArtBakery. The centre offers tools and an infrastructure to artists interested in multimedia productions and it is characterised by an active role in training. Leye was considered a key artist and intellectual by Cameroonian artists of his generation and younger.

Leye expressed his attention to the ways history is told and knowledge is transmitted and forgotten through his art works, writings and his active involvement in conferences and think tanks. His theoretical contributions focused on the structure of cultural institutions, on network systems, on artistic and cultural practices and on urban transformations.

Videos and installations 
 Na Lingi Yo, 2007
 Sankofa River, 1997
 We Are the World, video, 2006
 Elections, UCA project, 2007
 Honey Moon
 Avis sur Visage, video installation, 2007
 The Beautiful Beast, video installation
 Stickers and Wall, Alexandria, Egypt, 2004
 Dancing With the Moon, video installation, 2003
 Reel Location, video, 2002
 The Walking Mirror, video, 2001
 Visa-je, video installation, 2000
 The Voice of the Moon, video installation
 Collaboration with Collectif Auto Da Fe, No Art on Two Dollars A Day, video. Video made from the performance made during SUD Salon Urbain de Douala 2007.

Solo exhibitions 
 Fiction ou realite?, Fri'Art, Fribourg, 2003 
 Dancing with the Moon, doual'art, Douala, 2003 
 Goddy Leye, Icba Gallery, Salvador de Bahia, 2001
 Sankofa Blues, doual'art, Douala, 2000
 Sankofa Blues, Goethe institute, Yaoundé, 1999
 Behind the Scenes, Electronic Cafe International, Santa Monica, US/on Internet, 1999
 Sankofa River, doual'art, Douala, 1999
 Sankofa, French Cultural Centre, Douala, Douala, 1999
 Sankofa Video, Goethe institute, Yaoundé, 1999
 Fouilles Sauvages, doual'art, Douala, 1996
 Bois Sacré, Goethe institute, Yaoundé, 1995
 Bois Sacré, Ifa, 1995

Group exhibitions 
Goddy Leye's work is exhibited in numerous festivals and international exhibitions.

 Breaking News. Contemporary Photography from the Middle East and Africa, Ex Ospedale Sant'Agostino, Modena, 2010
 SUD PARIS, Maison Revue Noire, Paris, 2010
 Cameroonian Touch.2 – doual'art, Douala, 2010
 This is now 1 & 2 – L'appartement 22, 1st Johannesburg Art Fair, 2088 and Rabat, 2009
 Prêt-à-pARTager, Mode-Fotografie-Workshop, curated by IFA Institut für Auslandsbeziehungen, Dakar, 2008 (touring exhibition)
 Africa Remix, Johannesburg Art Gallery, Johannesburg, 2007
 Ba Mama, Galerie Mam, Douala, 2007
 Contemporary Vision, The World Bank, Yaoundé, 2007
 Africa Remix, Centre Pompidou, Paris, 2006
 Exit Tour, Douala, Cotonou, Lomé, Accra, Ouagadougou, Bamako, Dakar, 2006, promoted by ArtBakery.
 Africa Remix, Museum Kunstpalast, Düsseldorf, Germany, 2004
 New, Netwerk galerij, Aalst, 2003
 Unesco laureates, 18th street arts complex, Santa Monica, USA, 2003
 Post-border land, SBK, Amsterdam, 2003
 Nuits métis, la Ciota, 2003
 Electromediascope, The Nelson Atkins Museum of Art, Kansas City, 2002
 Slow, Shedhalle, Zurich, Switzerland, 2002
 Rendez-vous at Xiamen, Chinese European Art centre, Xiamen, 2002
 Nuits métis, la Ciota, 2002
 Videoformes 2002, Clermont-Ferrand, 2002. Presentation of the video The Walking Mirror.
 Right 2 fight, Sarah Lawrence College, New York, 2002
 Sao Paulo Biennial, Blick Wechsel, São Paulo, Brazil, 2002
 Playtime, Johannesburg, 2002
 Bili Bidjocka / Goddy Leye, Espace Doual'Art, Douala, Cameroon, 2001
 BlickWechsel, IFA-Galerie, Berlin, 2001
 Lucarne, Goethe-Institut, Yaounde, Cameroon, 2001
 BlickWechsel, Bonn and IFA-Galerie Stuttgart, 2000
 Total Global, Museum fur Gegenwartskunst, Bale, 2000
 Havana Biennial, Havana, 2000
 Dak'Art 2000, Biennale de l'Art contemporain africain, Dakar Biennale, Dakar, 2000
 South Meets West, Berne, 2000
 Boulev'Art, Cotonou, 2000
 Sept des cents derniers jours, Espace Doual'art, Douala, 2000
 Lille 2000, Lille, 2000
 South Meets West, Accra, 1999
 Dream, Espace Doual'art, Douala, 1999
 Triennale der Kleinplastik, Stuttgart, 1998
 Dak'art 98, Dakar Biennale, Dakar, 1998
 Fenac 98 Festival national de l'Art et de la Culture, Ebolowa, 1998
 L'Art entre Tradition et Globalisation, Goethe-Institut, Yaoundé, 1997
 Le Kwatt, Espace Doual'art, Douala, 1997
 Babil 2, Espace Doual'art, Douala, 1997
 Resource Art Cameroon, Goethe-Institute, Yaoundé, 1996
 Cameroon Art, Galeria Arte Mondo, Sarrano, 1996
 Africa Unite, Galerie Africréa, Yaoundé, 1996
 Nouvelles Tendances de la Peinture camerounaise, Galerie Africréa, Yaoundé, 1996
 Babil, Goethe-Institute, Yaoundé, 1995
 Taxi-couleurs, ERBA Ecole régionale des Beaux-Arts, Angers, 1995
 Fenac 94, Douala, 1994
 Taxi-Couleurs, CCF-INA, Bamako, 1994
 Festac 88 National Festival of Arts and Culture, Douala, 1988

Theoretic contributions and curatorial work 
Goddy Leye contributed to publications and magazines such as Chimurenga magazine. He actively supported the creation of the magazine DiARTgonale founded by the artist Achilleka. 
He was the founder and director of the centre ArtBakery, started in 2002. He was the curator of the project Bessengue City organised in the neighbourhood of Bessengue in Douala in 2002 and he was the promoter in 2006 of Exit Tour.

References

Further reading 
 Lucia Babina, Dunja Herzog, Dominique Malaquais, Losing Goddy Leye, 1965–2011 in "African Arts", Autumn 2011, vol. 44, n. 3, pp. 12–13.
 ArtealCentro 2010 – Visible. Where art leaves its own field and becomes visible as part of something else, Cittadellarte, Biella, 2010.

External links 

 Goddy Leye's works online
 Goddy Leye's website
 an interview with Goddy Leye (2008)

List of public art in Douala

1965 births
Cameroonian art curators
Multimedia artists
Conceptual artists
Cameroonian artists
2011 deaths